Spring Street station is a station on the Orange Line of the San Diego Trolley. It is located in San Diego suburb of La Mesa, California and serves both nearby residences and as a commuter park and ride location.

History
Spring Street was the eastern terminus of the Euclid Line following the opening of the second segment on May 12, 1989.

This station was renovated from late August through December 2012 as part of the Trolley Renewal Project, although the station remained open during construction.

Station layout
There are two tracks, each served by a side platform.

See also
 List of San Diego Trolley stations

References

Orange Line (San Diego Trolley)
San Diego Trolley stations
La Mesa, California
Railway stations in the United States opened in 1989
1989 establishments in California